"Day by Day" is a folk rock ballad from the 1971 Stephen Schwartz and John-Michael Tebelak musical Godspell. It is the third song in the show's score and is reprised as the closing number for the 1973 film version.

Lyrics
The song's refrain follows a prayer ascribed to the 13th-century English bishop Saint Richard of Chichester:
May I know Thee more clearly,
Love Thee more dearly,
Follow Thee more nearly.

The version in Godspell follows more closely the wording in Hymn 429 of the 1940 Hymnal:
Day by day,
Dear Lord, of thee three things I pray:
To see thee more clearly,
Love thee more dearly,
Follow thee more nearly,
Day by day."Day by Day" was first a hit in Australia, where both Judy Stone and Colleen Hewett released competing versions of the track in late 1971.  Hewett's version reached #2 in the Kent Music Report, while Stone's take reached #25.

In 1972, a version of the song from the album Godspell (1971) by the original off-Broadway cast was released as a single in the US, and attributed simply to the group name "Godspell".  Robin Lamont was the lead singer, uncredited.  "Day by Day" spent 14 weeks on the Billboard Hot 100, peaking at the #13 position on July 29, 1972. Billboard ranked it as the No. 90 song for 1972.

Chart history

Weekly charts
Godspell

Holly Sherwood

Colleen Hewett

Judy Stone 

Year-end charts

Cover versions
The instrumental cover band Hot Butter released a version on their 1972 album Hot Butter.
In 1972 Shirley Bassey released her cover version of the song on a Universal Artists Records single and has it also on her album And I Love You So from 1972, her live album from Carnegie Hall Concert 1973 as well as her live album from Japan 1974.
 The jazz duo Jackie & Roy covered the song (Track 1) on the 1972 CTI labeled album Time & Love.
The 5th Dimension's version was recorded for the Living Together, Growing Together album, released in 1973.
Another instrumental version, in the song's initial key, was used as the theme music for NBC's Today Show in the 1970s.
In March 1972, Holly Sherwood released "Day by Day" (which also incorporated a medley of two other numbers from the show) as her first single, produced by Tony Orlando for Rocky Road Records. Her version went to #104 on the US Billboard Bubbling Under the Hot 100 chart, #91 Cash Box, and #29 in the United Kingdom.
Andy Williams and Ray Conniff and His Singers both released versions in 1972 on albums that were both called Alone Again (Naturally).
The song was also covered by Irish pop singer Alma Carroll in 1972.
The song was covered by British pop singer Cilla Black who released it on her 1973 album Day by Day with Cilla which was her seventh and last studio album with producer George Martin.
 Cliff Richard recorded a live version dated September 1973 and released on his 1974 gospel album Help It Along. 
 Pat Lundy released a cover in 1976.
Christian rap/rock group DC Talk covered the song (with additional lyrics) on their 1995 album Jesus Freak.
Christian rock group House of Heroes covered DC Talk's version of the song on their 2013 album The Knock-Down Drag-Outs.
A previously unreleased version by the 1970s British vocal group Design was included on their 2012 CD One Sunny Day: Singles and Rarities 1968–1978.
Judy Collins released a version on her Amazing Grace LP in 1985.
Homer Simpson sings a version of "Day by Day" in the episode entitled "Pulpit Friction" on the TV series The Simpsons.

In popular culture
In the 2000 film Meet the Parents, Greg Focker (Ben Stiller) is asked by Jack Byrnes (Robert De Niro) to say Grace before dinner, resulting in Greg reciting the lyrics from "Day by Day."
In the 2001 film Wet Hot American Summer'', summer camp counselors Susie (Amy Poehler) and Ben (Bradley Cooper) direct a group of kids to sing and dance “Day by Day” in similar style and costume to the original Godspell Broadway cast, which they perform at the talent show. The audience claps along happily, but after the performance ends with a glowing luminescent cross on the wall, it is met with overwhelming boos. The host comments it is one of his favorite Broadway numbers, but erroneously pronounces it as “Day Bidet.”

References

External links

1971 songs
1971 singles
1972 singles
Bell Records singles
American folk rock songs
Folk ballads
Rock ballads
Songs written by Stephen Schwartz (composer)
Colleen Hewett songs
Andy Williams songs
Songs from musicals
1970s ballads